is a Japanese actor, voice actor and narrator currently working for Aoni Production. He was born in Ōta, Tokyo. Satō is best known for the roles of Buffaloman, Sunshine (Kinnikuman), Miyamoto Musashi (Yaiba), Adah (Mushiking: King of the Beetles), and Dora-med III (The Doraemons). He is also known for playing numerous roles in the Kinnikuman, Dr. Slump and Arale-chan, Fist of the North Star, and Dragon Ball series.

Satō also made a voice guest in episode 3 of GoGo Sentai Boukenger and Juken Sentai Gekiranger as a rare moment.

Filmography

Anime television series
1978
Galaxy Express 999 (Clone B)
Majokko Tickle (Station Attendant, Employee (A))

1979
Mobile Suit Gundam (Marigan, Twanning)
Cyborg 009 (Announcer, Commander, Gasur, Hitman B, Minister of the Military)
Manga Kotowaja Jiten (Tsuruo)

1980
Manga Kotowaja Jiten (Tsuruo)

1981
Queen Millennia (Councilor A, Teacher)
Sengoku Majin Goshōgun (Art Cronkite, Chancellor, Secretary, Swan)
Tiger Mask II (Abdullah The Butcher)
Taiyou no Kiba Dougram (Dark)
Dr. Slump (Pagos, Field Farmer, Jr. High Principal, Pig)
Hello! Sandybell (Scott)

1982
Ochamegami Monogatari Korokoro Poron (Dionysus)
Armored Fleet Dairugger XV (Saruta Katz, Al Luciano, Baratalia, Gigolone, Holtes, Nolan, Seidel, Wakasa)
Space Adventure Cobra (Barg, Gus, Zack Simmons)
Sentō Mecha Xabungle (Medick)

1983
Genesis Climber Mospeada (Russ)
Kinnikuman (Buffaloman, Iwao, Sunshine, Beauty Rhodes, Curry Cook, Devil Magician, Doctor Bombe, Doryman, Dr. Bombay, Gagne Mask, Gania, Kamehame, Kasugano Oyakata, King Cobra, PM Yasuhiro Nakasone, Prince Kamehame, Ramenman, Skull Bozu, Specialman, Station Manager, Tileman, TV Producer)
Kōsoku Denjin Albegas (General Daston, General Darry, The Great Deran, Vice-Principal)
Stop! Hibari-kun (Director, Geronimo, Yakuza A)
Aura Battler Dunbine (Zyaba)
Arcadia of My Youth: Endless Orbit SSX (Green Izma, Kruger, Secretary of Defense, Soldier)

1984
Giant Gorg (Dr. Hekkeru)
Tongari Bōshi no Memoru (Cinthia's Father)
Fist of the North Star (Belga, Bugal, Elder, Gauguin, Gōda, Juza's Uncle, Kidnapper, Kogure, Village Elder)

1985
Aoki Ryūsei SPT Layzner (Getey)
Mobile Suit Zeta Gundam (Dr. Hasan)
Gegege no Kitarō (Masao)
Touch (Katagiri)
Dancougar - Super Beast Machine God (General Gil Dorom)
Highschool! Kimengumi (Himawari, Ranto Jougai)

1986
Ai Shoujo Pollyanna Monogatari (Edward Kent)
Ginga Nagareboshi Gin (Kirikaze, Terry)
Go-Q-Choji Ikkiman (Ramboman)
Saint Seiya (Chrysaor Krishna, Docrates, Gigas, Jaki)
Dragon Ball (Assistant Black, Dolphin, Jasmine, Nao, Pagos, Pig, Rabbit Gang Member, Saber Tiger; Snow's Father)
Machine Robo: Revenge of Cronos (Blade)

1987
Kiteretsu Daihyakka (Sasaki-sensei)
City Hunter (Kurosaki)
Transformers: The Headmasters (Alpha Trion, Bee Drone, First Aid, Grimlock, Grotusque, Hook, Kaen, Punch-Counterpunch, Sandstorm, Scourge, Searchlight, Skydive, Sureshot, Tantrum, Techna)
Lady Lady!! (Robert)

1988
Sakigake!! Otoko Juku (Dokugantetsu, Nightclub Manager, Vice Principal, Yakuza A)
Tatakae!! Ramenman (Marvelous Hagler, Tiaolong, Tie Guanyin, Treasurer, Village Elder, Yinjiao)
Transformers: Super God Masterforce (Gilmer)

1989
Akuma-kun (Guraukosu, Hyakume-Oyaji)
Transformers: Victory (Frank, Mayor Burns, Perceptor)
Dragon Ball Z (Blueberry, Boss, Coach, Giant, Gozu, King Cold, Lao Chu, Mezu, Musuka, Olivu, Saichourou, Shenlong, Tard)

1990
Dragon Warrior (Ivan)
Mashin Eiyuden Wataru 2 (Death Gondor)

1991
Kikou Keisatsu Metal Jack (TV Announcer)
Kinnikuman: Kinnikusei Ōi Sōdatsu-hen (King Mayumi Kinniku, Mammothman, Mariposa, Parthenon, The Manriki)

1993
Kenyū Densetsu Yaiba (Musashi Miyamoto)
Ghost Sweeper Mikami (Owner)
Jungle no Ouja Taa-chan (Dan King)
Slam Dunk (Hayama, Takatou Riki, Tetsuo)*
Yūsha Tokkyū Might Gaine (Wolfgang)
Wakakusa Monogatari Nan to Jou Sensei (Prof. Farth)

1994
Magic Knight Rayearth (Golem, Monster)
Red Baron (Sigma Computer - Male Half)

1995
Kuso Kagaku Sekai Gulliver Boy (Chaptar)
The Slayers (Soromu, Wizard 1)
Romeo's Blue Skies (Citron, Old Man B)

1996
Gegege no Kitarō (Yagyou-san)
Detective Conan (Kawana)

1997
Berserk (Hail)
Chō Mashin Eiyūden Wataru (Rimitta)
Dragon Ball GT (Black, Shén Lóng)

1998
Gasaraki (Krause)
Shadow Skill (Iba Stora)
Pokémon (Tamaranze)
Orphen (Batrov)
Yu-Gi-Oh! (Black, Vice Principal)
Master Keaton (Prof. Stevens)

1999
Bucky - The Incredible Kid (Jibaku Ou)
Dai-Guard (Nishima)
Blue Gender (Victor)
Orphen: The Revenge (McGregor)
Master of Mosquiton '99 (Jijiya, Sage, School President)
Maze (Woll Dolnard)
One Piece (John Giant)

2001
Inuyasha (Goshinki, Nanushi)
Vandread: The Second Stage (Doyen)
Angelic Layer (Shuko's Father)
Rune Soldier (Gonga)

2002
Ultimate Muscle (Chairman Harabote Muscle, Sunshine, The Coasterman)

2003
R.O.D -The TV- (Irving)
Kino's Journey (Immigration Officer)
Getbackers (Gen Radou)
Bobobo-bo Bo-bobo (Tuyosi)

2004
Samurai Champloo (Clerk, Machinenki)
Futakoi (Kenmochi)
Ring ni Kakero 1 (Doctor)

2005
GUNxSWORD (Nero)
Kouchuu Ouja Mushiking ~Mori no Tami no Densetsu~ (Adah)
Bleach (Stealth Force Member)
Beet the Vandel Buster (Captain)
Beet the Vandel Buster Excellion (Captain)
Pokémon Advance (Tamaranze)

2006
Ayakashi: Samurai Horror Tales (Genshiro)
Idaten Jump (Sebastian)
Gunparade Orchestra (Commander)

2007
Gintama (Soul Flat Sugar Master)
Gegege no Kitarō (Gasha Dokuro, KyouRinRin, Old Man)
Ghost Slayers Ayashi (Doi)
Bakugan Battle Brawlers (HAL-G)
Hatarakids My Ham Gumi (Headquarters Chief)

2008
Code Geass: Lelouch of the Rebellion R2 (Black King)
Hakaba Kitarō (Hageyama)
Bleach (Kumoi Gyōkaku)
Rosario + Vampire (School Chairman)
Rosario + Vampire Capu2 (School Chairman)

2009
Dragon Ball Kai (Kame-Sennin)

2010
Super Robot Wars OG: The Inspector (Rishuu Toudou)
Digimon Xros Wars (Gargoylemon)
Fairy Tail (Ivan Dreyar)

2012
Shining Hearts (Hank)
Tanken Driland (Blacksmith Kogoru)
Digimon Xros Wars: The Young Hunters Who Leapt Through Time (Gargoylemon)

2013
Attack on Titan (Armin's Grandfather)

2014
Abarenbō Rikishi!! Matsutarō (Company President)

2015
Attack on Titan: Junior High (Armin's Grandfather)
Dragon Ball Super (Kame-Sennin)

2018
Sword Gai (Kigetsu)

2021
Tsukimichi: Moonlit Fantasy (Morris)
One Piece (Gan Fall)

OVA
Gall Force (xxxx) (Gorn)
Little Nemo: Adventures in Slumberland (xxxx) (Oompo)
Detective Conan: Conan vs. Kid vs. Yaiba (xxxx) (Miyamoto Musashi)
Amada Anime Series: Super Mario Bros. (xxxx) (Koopa, Larry Koopa, Iggy Koopa)
Mobile Suit Gundam 0083: Stardust Memory (1991) (Bob)
Ushio and Tora (1992) (Grandpa)
Legend of the Galactic Heroes (1988) (Erlache)
Mobile Suit Gundam Unicorn (2010) (Hasan)

Anime movies
Jigoku Sensei Nube (xxxx) (Vice Principal)
Kinnikuman series (xxxx) (Buffaloman, Iwao)
The Kabocha Wine (xxxx) (Kameyama)
The Doraemons (xxxx) (Doramed III)
Super Mario Bros.: The Great Mission to Rescue Princess Peach! (1986) (Koopa Troopa)
Violinist of Hamelin (xxxx) (Oboe)
Dragon Ball Z: The Tree of Might (1990) (Lakasei)
Dragon Ball Z: Cooler's Revenge (1991) (Doore)
Dragon Ball Z: Broly – The Legendary Super Saiyan (1993) (King Vegeta)
Dragon Ball Z: Wrath of the Dragon (1995) (Kame-Sennin)
One Piece: Baron Omatsuri and the Secret Island (2005) (Keroshot)
Dragon Ball Z: Battle of Gods (2013) (Kame-Sennin)
Dragon Ball Z: Resurrection 'F' (2015) (Kame-Sennin)

Games
Airforce Delta (xxxx) (Jamie Jones)
Castlevania series (Death and others)
Dragon Ball Z (xxxx) (Porunga)
Dynasty Warriors series (xxxx) (Zuo Ci)
Gurumin (xxxx) (Iwao)
Kinnikuman New Generation vs. Legends (xxxx) (Sunshine)
Kinnikuman Generations series (xxxx) (Sunshine, Prince Kamehame/First Kinnikuman Great, Chairman)
Kinnikuman Muscle Grand Prix series (xxxx) (Sunshine, Chairman)
Lunar 2: Eternal Blue (xxxx) (Lunn)
Star Ocean: The Second Story (xxxx) (Indalecio/Gabriel)
Super Robot Wars Original Generations (xxxx) (Rishu Togo)
Xenosaga series (xxxx) (Sellers)
SegaSonic the Hedgehog (1993) (Doctor Eggman)
Policenauts (1994) (Salvatore Toscanini)
Metal Gear Solid (1998) (Donald Anderson)
Final Fantasy X (2001) (Zaon, Jyscal Guado)
Metal Gear Solid 2: Sons of Liberty (2001) (Richard Ames)
Metal Gear Solid: Portable Ops (2006) (CIA Agent)

Tokusatsu
X-Bomber (1980) (Officer B)
Gridman the Hyper Agent (1993-1994) (Khan Digifer)
B-Fighter Kabuto (1996) (Mole Beast Mogerado (ep. 6))
Ultraman Tiga (1996-1997) (Kyrieloid (ep. 3), Ligatron (ep. 4), Alien Raybeak (ep. 13), Alien Muzan (ep. 14), Kyrieloid II (ep. 25), Metamorga (ep. 47))
Ultraman Dyna (1998-2002) (Alien Shilback (ep. 17), Bishmel (ep. 18))
Heisei Ultra Seven (1998-2002) (Alien Guts II (1998 ep. 2), Alien Pegassa II (2002 ep. 1))
Mirai Sentai Timeranger (2000) (Bodyguard Hydrid (ep. 21))
Kamen Rider Agito (2001) (Hydrozoa Lord / Hydrozoa Ignio (ep. 18 & 19), Lizard Lord / Stellio Dextera (ep. 37), Lizard Lord / Stellio Sinistra (ep. 37 - 39))
Bakuryuu Sentai Abaranger (2003-2004) (Wicked Life God Dezumozorlya (eps. 1 - 47) /DezumoLijewel (ep. 47)/ DezumoVoorla (Voice by Hidenari Ugaki, Bunkou Ogata) (ep. 48)/ DezumoGevirus (ep. 49 & 50))
Tokusou Sentai Dekaranger (2004) (Tylerian Durden (ep. 26))
Gougou Sentai Boukenger (2006) (Tsukumogami Jougami (ep. 3))
Jūken Sentai Gekiranger (2007) (Confrontation Beast Buffalo-Fist Gyuuya (ep. 3))
Engine Sentai Go-onger (2008) (Savage Land Barbaric Machine Beast Happa Banki (ep. 17))
Ultra Galaxy Mega Monster Battle: Never Ending Odyssey (2009) (Alien Reiblood)
Ultraman Zero Clash! Techtor Gear Black!! (2010) (Jiorugon)
Shuriken Sentai Ninninger (2015) (Youkai Tengu (ep. 6))

Dubbing roles

Live-action
 Black Panther (River Tribe Elder (Isaach de Bankolé))
 Black Panther: Wakanda Forever (River Tribe Elder (Isaach de Bankolé))
 Con Air (Earl "Swamp Thing" Williams (M. C. Gainey), Dale (Dennis Burkley))
 Pistol Whipped (Blue (Paul Calderón))

Animation
 Thomas the Tank Engine & Friends (Duke)

References

External links
  
 
 

1946 births
Living people
Japanese male video game actors
Japanese male voice actors
Komazawa University alumni
Male voice actors from Tokyo
Aoni Production voice actors